Thodoris "Theodoros" Karapetsas (Greek: Θοδωρής "Θεόδωρος" Καραπέτσας; born 25 July 1990) is a Greek footballer.

Career

Club career
He started his career at Grasshopper in 2007, and eventually in 2011 he moved to Wohlen mostly playing as a midfielder. In his last season, before he returned to Greece, in the Swiss Challenge League, Karapetsas recorded 17 appearances and scored 1 goal. He played for half season in Kerkyra, before he moved for the rest of the season to Fokikos.

International Appearances

References

External links
 
 Football.ch profile
 Hellenic Football Federation

1990 births
Living people
Greek footballers
Greek expatriate footballers
Expatriate footballers in Switzerland
FC Wohlen players
A.O. Kerkyra players
Fokikos A.C. players
Paniliakos F.C. players
Association football midfielders